Volante is the name given to convertible versions of various Aston Martin automobile models from 1965 onwards. They include:

 Short Chassis Volante (1965–1966)
 Volante (DB6-based) (1966–1971)
 V8 Volante (1978–1989)
 V8 Vantage Volante (1978–1990)
 (Virage) V8 Volante (1992–1996)
 DB7 Volante (1996–2004)
 DB9 Volante (2004–2016)
 DBS Volante (2009–2012)
 Virage Volante (2011–2012)
 Vanquish Volante (2013–2018)
 DB11 Volante (2018–present)
 DBS Superleggera Volante (2019–present)

Volante